A kinebar is a gold bar which contains a hologram to protect its authenticity. Kinebars use a hologram called a "Kinegram", a diffractive optically variable image device (DOVID) which is embossed into the gold substrate. "Kinegram" is a trademark of OVD Kinegram AG (Switzerland). The hologram is intended both as a high-security feature and for visual appeal.

Union Bank of Switzerland, through Argor-Heraeus SA (subsidiary of Commerzbank), has been applying the kinegram as a security device to the reverse of its minted bars since December 1993. The kinebar, now produced by UBS AG, is a registered trade mark of UBS.

See also
 Gold as an investment
 Security hologram

References

External links
Argor-Heraeus - The kinebar
The first Austrian kinebar
OVD Kinegram, Switzerland
Gold
Holography